Dolores, Texas is near the Rio Grande in western Webb County near Laredo, Texas. It was established as a Mexican village called San José in 1860. In 1882 the Cannel Coal Company opened mines along the Rio Grande. Cannel Coal Company built the Rio Grande and Eagle Pass Railroad to ship coal from the town and renamed the San José village after its company President's daughter Dolores. In 1914 Dolores reportedly had a population of 1,000. The mines were closed in 1939. Its population declined to 20 in 1936.  The population remained 20 according to the 1990 census.

References
 

Unincorporated communities in Texas
Unincorporated communities in Webb County, Texas
Laredo–Nuevo Laredo